Kanaan Live 1975 is a live performance album by Peter Frohmader, released on October 9, 2000 by Green Tree Records.

Track listing

Personnel
Adapted from the Kanaan Live 1975 liner notes.
Musicians
 Peter Frohmader – fretless bass guitar, electronics, gong, voice, cover art
 Uwe Rüdiger – drums, trumpet, voice
 Michael Schobert – Rhodes piano, synthesizer, voice

Release history

References 

2000 live albums
Peter Frohmader albums